Horsfieldia valida is a species of plant in the family Myristicaceae. It is a tree endemic to Sumatra.

References

valida
Endemic flora of Sumatra
Trees of Sumatra
Vulnerable plants
Taxonomy articles created by Polbot